Marianne Stone (23 August 1922 – 21 December 2009) was an English character actress. She performed in films from the early 1940s to the late 1980s, typically playing working class parts such as barmaids, secretaries and landladies. Stone appeared in nine of the Carry On films, and took part in an episode of the Carry On Laughing television series ("The Case of the Screaming Winkles"). She also had supporting roles with comedian Norman Wisdom.

Film work

Stone also appeared in Brighton Rock (1947), Seven Days to Noon (1950), The 39 Steps (1959), Lolita (1962), Ladies Who Do (1963), Oh! What a Lovely War (1969) and the first two "Quatermass" films. Her most serious and arguably most dramatic role was as Lena Van Broecken in three episodes of the BBC's Secret Army between 1977 and 1978.

Stone, whose nickname was "Mugsie", was credited in her early films under the name "Mary Stone", and also has been credited as "Marion Stone". She was married for fifty years, from 1947 to 1997, to actor-turned-theatre-critic and film historian Peter Noble, with whom she had two children, one of whom is DJ Kara Noble. She appeared in 201 films before the offers dried up in the 1980s and she retired.

Death

Stone died on 21 December 2009 at the age of 87.

Carry On contributions
 Carry On Nurse (1959) as Alice Able
 Carry On Constable (1960) as Miss Horton (voice only, for Lucy Griffiths)
 Carry On Jack (1963) as Peg
 Carry On Screaming! (1966) as Mrs Parker
 Carry On Don't Lose Your Head (1967) as Landlady
 Carry On Doctor (1967) as Mother
 Carry On at Your Convenience (1971) as Maud
 Carry On Matron (1972) as Mrs Putzova (scenes deleted)
 Carry On Girls (1973) as Miss Drew
 Carry On Dick (1974) as Maggie
 Carry On Behind (1975) as Mrs Rowan
 Carry On Laughing: "The Case of the Screaming Winkles" (1975) as Madame Petra

Selected other filmography

 Miss London Ltd. (1943) (uncredited)
 When the Bough Breaks (1947) as Shop Assistant
 Escape Dangerous (1947) as Jacqueline Fabre
 Brighton Rock (1948) as Waitress (credited as Mary Stone)
 The Idol of Paris (1948) as Theresa's Secretary
 It's Hard to Be Good (1948) as Clerk in Newspaper Office (uncredited)
 A Boy, a Girl and a Bike (1949) as Minor Role (uncredited)
 Marry Me! (1949) as Elsie
 Adam and Evalyn (1949) as Minor Role (uncredited)
 A Run for Your Money (1949) as Miss Carpenter (uncredited)
 Miss Pilgrim's Progress (1949) as Second Factory Girl (uncredited)
 Seven Days to Noon (1950) as Woman in Phone Box (uncredited)
 Rocky Mountain (1950) as Stage Passenger (uncredited)
 The Clouded Yellow (1950) as Young Woman at Nora's House (uncredited)
 Blackmailed (1951) as Maggie
 Appointment with Venus (1951) as A.T.S. Auxiliary
 High Treason (1951) as Alfie's Mother (uncredited)
 The Magic Box (1951) as Bride in Wedding Group
 Angels One Five (1952) as W.A.A.F.
 Time Gentlemen, Please! (1952) as Mrs. Pincer
 Venetian Bird (1952) (uncredited)
 The Pickwick Papers (1952) as Bit Part (uncredited)
 The Net (1953) as Maisie
 Spaceways (1953) as Mrs. Rogers (uncredited)
 Colonel March Investigates (1953) as Customer in Bank (uncredited)
 A Day to Remember (1953) as Doreen, Shorty's Girl Friend (uncredited)
 The Dog and the Diamonds (1953)
 36 Hours (1953) as Pam Palmer
 You Know What Sailors Are (1954) as Elsie - Barmaid
 The Runaway Bus (1954) as Travel Girl
 The Good Die Young (1954) as Molly, the Barmaid (uncredited)
 The Gay Dog (1954) as Barmaid (uncredited)
 Dance Little Lady (1954) as Nurse
 Twist of Fate (1954) as Annabelle (uncredited)
 The Crowded Day (1954) as Mr. Stanton's Secretary
 Mad About Men (1954) as Waitress (scenes deleted)
 The Brain Machine (1955) as Hospital Technician (uncredited)
 Barbados Quest (1955) as Mrs. Wilson - Woman Cleaner
 The Quatermass Xperiment (1955) as Central Clinic Nurse (uncredited)
 Simon and Laura (1955) as Elsie
 Man of the Moment (1955) as Florrie the Cleaner (uncredited)
 Fun at St. Fanny's (1955) (uncredited)
 Portrait of Alison (1956) as Receptionist
 Lost (1956) as Mrs. Marley (uncredited)
 Private's Progress (1956) as Miss Sugden (uncredited)
 Cloak Without Dagger (1956) as Mrs. Markley
 Bond of Fear (1956) as Mrs. Simon
 Charley Moon (1956) as Silvers' Secretary (uncredited)
 Passport to Treason (1956) as Miss 'Jonesy' Jones
 Yield to the Night (1956) as Richardson
 The Intimate Stranger (1956) as Miss Cedrick, Ben's Secretary (uncredited)
 Eyewitness (1956) as Cinema Usherette (uncredited)
 High Terrace (1956) as Mansfield's Landlady
 A Touch of the Sun (1956) as Miss Grey, Manager's Secretary (uncredited)
 Tiger in the Smoke (1956)
 Brothers in Law (1957) as Minor Role (uncredited)
 The Good Companions (1957) as Honeymoon Couple #1
 Don Quixote (1957) as Peasant Girl (English version, voice, uncredited)
 Quatermass 2 (1957) as Secretary
 At the Stroke of Nine (1957) as Secretary
 Woman in a Dressing Gown (1957) as Hairdresser
 Hell Drivers (1957) as Nurse Attending Gino
 Time Lock (1957) (uncredited)
 Just My Luck (1957) as Tea Bar Attendant
 Man from Tangier (1957) as Woman in Hotel
 The Naked Truth (1957) (uncredited)
 Carve Her Name with Pride (1958) as Mother at Birthday Party (uncredited)
 The Golden Disc (1958) as Dryden's Secretary
 Innocent Sinners (1958) as Sparkey's Mother (uncredited)
 A Night to Remember (1958) as Stewardess (uncredited)
 A Cry from the Streets (1958) as Cleaner #1 (uncredited)
 Corridors of Blood (1958) as Woman Arrested at Black Ben's (uncredited)
 Horrors of the Black Museum (1959) as Neighbour
 The Man Who Liked Funerals (1959) as Bentham's secretary
 No Trees in the Street (1959) as Mrs. Jokel
 Carlton-Browne of the F.O. (1959) as Woman in Cinema
 The 39 Steps (1959) as Hospital Administrator (uncredited)
 Tiger Bay (1959) as Mrs. Williams
 Jack the Ripper (1959) as Drunken Woman
 Operation Bullshine (1959) as Sgt. Cook
 The Heart of a Man (1959) as Counter Girl (uncredited)
 I'm All Right Jack (1959) as T.V. Receptionist
 Jet Storm (1959)
 Follow a Star (1959) (uncredited)
 Please Turn Over''' (1959) as Mrs. Waring
 The Angry Silence (1960) as Mavis
 Hell Is a City (1960)
 Never Let Go (1960) as Madge
 Doctor in Love (1960) as Hospital Sister (uncredited)
 The Big Day (1960) as Madge Delaney
 Five Golden Hours (1961) as Tina
 Double Bunk (1961) as Prospective Purchaser's Wife
 Watch it, Sailor! (1961) as Woman with Child (uncredited)
 The Frightened City (1961) as Barmaid (Riviera)
 On the Fiddle (1961) as Stretcher Bearer (uncredited)
 The Day the Earth Caught Fire (1961) as Miss Evans, Jeff's Secretary (uncredited)
 Play It Cool (1962) as Beatnik Woman (uncredited)
 Gaolbreak (1962) as Mrs. Marshall
 Crooks Anonymous (1962)
 Two and Two Make Six (1962) as Grand Hotel day receptionist
 Lolita (1962) as Vivian Darkbloom
 Jigsaw (1962) as Secretary (uncredited)
 Band of Thieves (1962) as Cleaner
 The Wild and the Willing (1962) as Clara
 Night of the Prowler (1962) as Mrs. Cross
 The Fast Lady (1962) as Miss Oldham
 The Cool Mikado (1963) as Espresso Waitress (uncredited)
 The Wrong Arm of the Law (1963) as Woman in Front Row at Meeting (uncredited)
 Paranoiac (1963) as Woman #2 (uncredited)
 Heavens Above! (1963) as Miss Palmer
 Echo of Diana (1963) as Miss Green
 Doctor in Distress (1963) as Cafe Waitress (uncredited)
 Stolen Hours (1963) (uncredited)
 West 11 (1963) as Bit Role (uncredited)
 The World Ten Times Over (1963) (uncredited)
 The Victors (1963) as Prostitute at Hotel de Flandre (uncredited)
 Ladies Who Do (1963) as Mrs. Gubbins
 A Stitch in Time (1963) as Mrs. Cutforth - Shop Customer (uncredited)
 The Marked One (1963) as Mrs. Benson
 The Hi-Jackers (1963) as Lil
 Return to Sender (1963) as Kate
 Nothing but the Best (1964) as Horton's Secretary
 Witchcraft (1964) as Forrester's Secretary
 The Beauty Jungle (1964) as Rita (uncredited)
 A Hard Day's Night (1964) as Society Reporter (uncredited)
 Blind Corner (1964) (uncredited)
 Rattle of a Simple Man (1964) as Barmaid (uncredited)
 The Curse of the Mummy's Tomb (1964) as Bey's Landlady
 Traitor's Gate (1964) as Cashier at Dandy Club
 We Shall See , (Edgar Wallace Mysteries), (1964) as Jenny
 Troubled Waters (1964) as Miss Stone
 Act of Murder (1964) as Bobbie
 The Intelligence Men (1965) as Woman in Lift (uncredited)
 Hysteria (1965) as Marcus Allan's Secretary - Miss Grogan
 Catch Us If You Can (1965) as Mrs. Vera Stone
 Devils of Darkness (1965) as The Duchess
 You Must Be Joking! (1965) as Fan Club Worker (uncredited)
 The Night Caller (1965) as Madge Lilburn
 Strangler's Web (1965) as Alicia Preston
 The Wrong Box (1966) as Spinster
 The Sandwich Man (1966) (uncredited)
 The Spy with a Cold Nose (1966) as Mrs. Whitby (uncredited)
 A Countess from Hong Kong (1967) as Reporter #1
 Don't Lose Your Head (1967) as Landlady
 The Jokers (1967) as Woman in Scarf (uncredited)
 To Sir, with Love (1967) as Gert
 The Long Duel (1967) as Major's Wife
 The Man Outside (1967)
 Berserk! (1967) as Wanda
 Here We Go Round the Mulberry Bush (1968) as Mrs. Kelly (uncredited)
 Don't Raise the Bridge, Lower the River (1968) as Air Passenger (uncredited)
 The Bliss of Mrs. Blossom (1968) as Factory tea lady
 Baby Love (1969) as Manageress
 Lock Up Your Daughters (1969)
 Crooks and Coronets (1969) as Visitor to Stately Home (uncredited)
 Oh, What a Lovely War! (1969) as Mill Girl
 The Best House in London (1969) as Machinist (uncredited)
 Hoverbug (1969) as Mrs. Gutteridge
 Incense for the Damned (1970) as Cheerful Lady at Party (uncredited)
 Every Home Should Have One (1970) as TV Production Assistant No. 1 (uncredited)
 Doctor in Trouble (1970) as Spinster / Plain Woman
 The Games (1970) (uncredited)
 Scrooge (1970) as Party Guest
 There's a Girl in My Soup (1970) as Woman Reporter at London Airport
 The Firechasers (1971)
 All the Right Noises (1971) as Landlady
 The Raging Moon (1971) as 1st Nurse
 Countess Dracula (1971) as Kitchen Maid
 Assault (1971) as Matron
 Mr. Forbush and the Penguins (1971) as Policewoman
 Whoever Slew Auntie Roo? (1971) as Miss Wilcox
 Danny Jones (1972) as Woman in hotel
 Tower of Evil (1972) as Nurse
 All Coppers Are... (1972) as Woman in Pub
 Au Pair Girls (1972) as Mrs. Fairfax
 Bless This House (1972) as Muriel
 The Love Ban (1973) as Customer in Chemists
 The Creeping Flesh (1973) as Female Assistant
 Baxter! (1973) as Woman
 The Vault of Horror (1973) as Jane (segment 2 "The Neat Job")
 Penny Gold (1973) as Mrs. Parsons
 The Cherry Picker (1974) as Mrs. Lal
 Mistress Pamela (1974) as Katie
 Craze (1974) as Jane – Barmaid
 Confessions of a Window Cleaner (1974) as Woman in Cinema
 Percy's Progress (1974) as Reporter (uncredited)
 That Lucky Touch (1975) as Party guest
 I'm Not Feeling Myself Tonight (1976) as Consultant
 The Incredible Sarah (1976)
 Confessions from a Holiday Camp (1977) as Waitress
 Sammy's Super T-Shirt (1978) as Neighbour
 What's Up Superdoc! (1978) as Dr. Maconachie
 The Class of Miss MacMichael (1979) as Mrs. Lee
 The Human Factor (1979) as MatronThe Balance of Nature (1983) as Dawn’s mum
 Funny Money (1983) as Admissions Nurse
 The Wicked Lady (1983) as Customer in Shop
 Déjà Vu (1985) as Mabel
 Terry on the Fence (1986) as Mrs. Parsons
 Scotland Yard (TV series) The Tyburn Case (1957) as Secretary
 Scotland Yard (TV series) Person Unknown (1956) as Mrs Cusick
 Scotland Yard (TV series) The Ghost Train Murder (1959) as Mrs Blair

Bibliography
 Jonathan Rigby, English Gothic Robert Ross, The Carry On Story Robert Ross, The Carry On Companion Robert Ross, Mr Carry On: The Life and work of Peter Rogers Neil Snelgrove, The Carry On book of Statistics Richard Webber, The A-Z of Everything Carry On Kenneth Williams, The Kenneth Williams Diaries''

References

External links
 
 Obituary in The Independent

1922 births
2009 deaths
English film actresses
English television actresses
British comedy actresses